Kandhar Fort or Kandhar Khilla is a fort located in Kandhar,  Nanded district in the state of Maharashtra, India. Its construction attributed to the Rashtrakuta King Krishna III of Malkhed.

References

Forts in Maharashtra
Tourist attractions in Nanded district